Asteropeia micraster is a species of plant in the Asteropeiaceae family. It is endemic to Madagascar.  Its natural habitat is sandy shores. It is threatened by habitat loss.

References

Endemic flora of Madagascar
micraster
Endangered plants
Taxonomy articles created by Polbot